Wee Willie Winkie is a nursery rhyme. It may also refer to:

Wee Willie Winkie and Other Child Stories, a collection of short stories by Rudyard Kipling
Wee Willie Winkie (film), a 1937 film based on the Kipling story, starring Shirley Temple
Wee Willie Winkie, the hero in a long-running Treasure (magazine) story series
Wee Willie Winkie, also known as William Winkie, a character in Jasper Fforde's 2005 book The Big Over Easy
"Wee Willie Winkie", a song numbered 13711 in the Roud Folk Song Index
Wee Willie Winkie, a minor character in Salman Rushdie's novel Midnight's Children

See also
The Kin-der-Kids and Wee Willie Winkie's World, two early comic strips drawn by Lyonel Feininger